The W Global Center is a 8-storey building located at Bonifacio Global City. It was built in 2012 and is classified as a Class A building. It is the second project of the W Group and is a joint venture of Wee family and GRCI. The W Global Center has a total office and commercial space area of 5,600 square meters with a typical floor area of 1,870 square meters. The mezzanine and ground floor consists of retail and dining options. It has recognised startups such as PawnHero that offer affordable credit to the unbanked.

Developer
W Land Holdings Inc. was incorporated for land developments in the Bonifacio Global City area. They have been developing residential projects since the 1980s. W Tower is their flagship project in the Bonifacio Triangle area in Bonifacio Global City. Global Restaurant Concepts Inc. (GRCI), on the other hand, develops and operates local restaurants in the Philippines.

Location
W Global Center is located at the corner of 9th Avenue and 30th Street in Bonifacio Global City, Taguig. It is in close proximity to Bonifacio High Street, Serendra, and Market! Market!.

References

Bonifacio Global City
Office buildings in Metro Manila
Office buildings completed in 2012
21st-century architecture in the Philippines